The 2022 Big Ten softball tournament was held at Secchia Stadium in East Lansing, Michigan, from May 11 through May 14, 2022. As the tournament winner, Nebraska earned the Big Ten Conference's automatic bid to the 2022 NCAA Division I softball tournament. All games of the tournament were aired on BTN. This was the first tournament since 2019, after the previous two tournaments were cancelled due to the COVID-19 pandemic.

Seeds
The top 12 Big Ten schools participate in the tournament. Teams are seeded by conference record, with the top four teams receiving a first-round bye.

Schedule

Bracket

References

Big Ten softball tournament
Tournament
Big Ten softball tournament